Julian Emanuel Zelizer (born 1969) is a professor of political history and an author in the United States at Princeton University. Zelizer has authored or co-authored several books about American political history; his focuses of study are the second half of the 20th century and the 21st century.

Education
Raised in Metuchen, New Jersey, Zelizer was educated at Metuchen High School, a comprehensive public high school, followed by Brandeis University. He obtained a PhD in History from Johns Hopkins University.

Life and career
Zelizer has contributed to CNN.com and The Atlantic. He is a regular commentator on news programs and has appeared in several documentary films. He penned the introduction to a 2016 edition of the Kerner report. He is the Malcolm Stevenson Forbes Professor of History and Public Policy.

He has twice won the D. B. Hardeman Prize, for Taxing America: Wilbur D. Mills, Congress, and the State, 1945–1975 and The Fierce Urgency of Now: Lyndon Johnson, Congress, and the Battle for the Great Society.

Fault Lines: A History of the United States Since 1974, co-authored with Kevin M. Kruse, received wide critical acclaim.

Zelizer's most-recent book, Burning Down the House: Newt Gingrich, the Fall of a Speaker, and the Rise of the New Republican Party, was called "insightful" by The New York Times, which also recognized it as one of the "100 Notable Books of 2020". The Washington Post wrote that it was "engaging" and "timely".

Zelizer is the son of the Princeton sociologist Viviana Zelizer and rabbi Gerald L. Zelizer.

Personal life
Zelizer is son of a notable Metuchen rabbi. In 1996, he married Nora Kay Moran at Congregation Adas Israel in Washington, D.C., presided over by his father. In 2012, he married fellow historian Meg Jacobs at the Synagogue for the Arts in New York City, again presided over by his father.

Books 

 Taxing America: Wilbur D. Mills, Congress, and the State, 1945–1975 (1999)
 On Capitol Hill: The Struggle to Reform Congress and its Consequences, 1948–2000 (2004)
 Arsenal of Democracy: The Politics of National Security – From World War II to the War on Terrorism (2009)
 Jimmy Carter: The American Presidents Series: The 39th President, 1977–1981 (2010)
 Conservatives in Power: The Reagan Years, 1981–1989: A Brief History with Documents (2011), with Meg Jacobs
 Governing America: The Revival of Political History (2012)
 The Fierce Urgency of Now: Lyndon Johnson, Congress, and the Battle for the Great Society (2015)
 Media Nation: The Political History of News in Modern America (2017), editor, with Bruce J. Schulman
 The Presidency of Barack Obama: A First Historical Assessment (2018), editor
 Fault Lines: A History of the United States Since 1974 (2019), with Kevin M. Kruse
 Burning Down the House: Newt Gingrich, the Fall of a Speaker, and the Rise of the New Republican Party (2020)
 Abraham Joshua Heschel: A Life of Radical Amazement (2021)
 The Presidency of Donald J. Trump: A First Historical Assessment (2022), editor

In addition to authoring the books listed above, Zelizer has edited or co-edited a number of books including, most recently, Myth America: Historians Take On the Biggest Legends and Lies About Our Past.

References

External links

Living people
1969 births
21st-century American non-fiction writers
21st-century American historians
21st-century American male writers
Brandeis University alumni
Johns Hopkins University alumni
Metuchen High School alumni
People from Metuchen, New Jersey
Princeton University faculty
CNN people
Historians from New Jersey
American male non-fiction writers